Cable is a surname or English origin, dating back to Middle Ages England. Notable people with the surname include:

 Ayrton Cable (born 2003), Social activist and entrepreneur, Grandson of Vince Cable
 Frank Cable (1863–1945), American engineer, an early pioneer in submarine development
 George Washington Cable (1844–1925), American novelist
 James Cable (1920–2001), British diplomat and naval strategic thinker
 Shawn Cable (born 1980), Canadian lacrosse player
 Stuart Cable (1970–2010), British drummer
 Tom Cable (born 1964), American football coach
 Vince Cable (born 1943), British politician
 Rigel Gemini (Rigel Cable) (born 1988), American music artist

See also

Calle (name)
Carle, surnames
Carle (given name)

References